Mian, also known as Karam Singh Wala Mian is a village in Sardulgarh tehsil of Mansa district in Punjab, India.

Geography 

Jherian Wali, Ullak, Burj Bhalaike , Jaurkian and Tandian are the surrounding villages.

Education and economy 

Education
{The village has a government CBSE high school 6th to 12th}

The village has a government primary school.

Economy

Agriculture is the main source of income.

References 

Villages in Mansa district, India